El Papiol is a municipality in the comarca of the Baix Llobregat in Catalonia, Spain. It is situated on the left bank of the Llobregat river, on the A-7 autopista from Valencia to La Jonquera and the C-1413 road from Sabadell to Molins de Rei. At West it borders on Castellbisbal and Pallejà, at North on Valldoreix (Sant Cugat del Vallès) and at East on Molins de Rei. It is served by the RENFE railway line R4 from Barcelona to Martorell, Vilafranca del Penedès and Sant Vicenç de Calders, which is connected to the village center by a minibus service (6.30 am to 10.31 pm). It is also served by a bus service (L67) and a night bus service (N51) from Barcelona to Esparreguera.

Demography

References

 Panareda Clopés, Josep Maria; Rios Calvet, Jaume; Rabella Vives, Josep Maria (1989). Guia de Catalunya, Barcelona: Caixa de Catalunya.  (Spanish).  (Catalan).
 Moran i Ocerinjauregui, Josep; Pladevall, Antoni; Riera i Viader, Sebastià; Alier, Roger; Codina, Jaume; Pagès i Paretas, Montserrat, et al. (1982). Gran Geografia Comarcal de Catalunya. Vol. 8: Barcelonès i Baix Llobregat, Barcelona: Fundació Enciclopèdia Catalana. .

External links
 Government data pages 

Municipalities in Baix Llobregat